Proclamation Island is a small rocky island  west of Cape Batterbee and close east of the Aagaard Islands of Antarctica.

Historic site
The island was discovered by the British Australian New Zealand Antarctic Research Expedition (BANZARE), led by Douglas Mawson, 1929–1931, and so named, following the reading of a proclamation on its summit on 13 January 1930 claiming the area for the British Crown. A cairn and plaque erected by Mawson at the time to commemorate the event has been designated a Historic Site or Monument (HSM 3) following a proposal by Australia to the Antarctic Treaty Consultative Meeting.

See also 
 List of Antarctic and subantarctic islands

References

Islands of Enderby Land
Historic Sites and Monuments of Antarctica